The 2017–18 Indian Super League playoffs was fourth playoffs series in the Indian Super League, one of the top Indian professional football leagues. The playoffs began on 7 March 2018 and concluded with the final on 17 March 2018 in Bangalore. 

The top four teams from the 2017–18 ISL regular season had qualified for the playoffs. The semi-finals took place over two legs while the final was a one-off match at the Sree Kanteerava Stadium. Chennaiyin won the final after defeating Bengaluru 3–2. This would be the second time that Chennaiyin won the title.

The defending champions from last season, ATK, failed to qualify for the playoffs this season and thus were not able to defend their title.

Season table

Teams
Bengaluru, a new expansion side in the Indian Super League, were the first side to qualify for the playoffs on 9 February 2018. The side managed to qualify after only 15 matches and having gained 33 points. Pune City became the second side to qualify for the playoffs after Jamshedpur, another new expansion side, were defeated by Bengaluru on 26 February. The victory for Bengaluru also ensured that they would finish the season at the top of the table.

Chennaiyin, the 2015 ISL season champions, were the third side to confirm their qualification for the playoffs on 27 February. This was due to Mumbai City suffering defeat to Delhi Dynamos. The last spot in the playoffs was not decided until the last match day of the regular season when Jamshedpur hosted Goa at the Kalinga Stadium. Both Jamshedpur and Goa were the only two sides eligible for that last spot. Goa would go on to win the match 3–0 and thus became the final team to qualify for the playoffs.

Bracket

Semi-finals

|}

Leg 1

Leg 2

Bengaluru won 3–1 on aggregate

Chennaiyin won 4–1 on aggregate

Final

Goalscorers
4 goals

  Sunil Chhetri (Bengaluru)

2 goals

  Jeje Lalpekhlua (Chennaiyin)
  Maílson Alves (Chennaiyin)

1 goal

  Manuel Lanzarote (Goa)
  Anirudh Thapa (Chennaiyin)
  Jonatan Lucca (Pune City)
  Dhanpal Ganesh (Chennaiyin)
  Raphael Augusto (Chennaiyin)
  Miku (Bengaluru)

Notes

References

2017–18 Indian Super League season